The North Alabama Lions baseball team represents the University of North Alabama, which is located in Florence, Alabama. The Lions are an NCAA Division I college baseball program that competes in the ASUN Conference. They began competing in Division I in 2019 and joined the ASUN Conference the same season.

The North Alabama Lions play all home games on campus at Mike D. Lane Field. Under the direction of Head Coach Mike Keehn, the Lions are transitioning from Division II to Division I and are not eligible for postseason play. In the program's 35 years in Division II, the Lions played in 12 NCAA Tournaments and advanced to the College World Series once in 1999.

Since the program's inception in 1932, 5 Lions have gone on to play in Major League Baseball, highlighted by 3-time World Series champion and 2013 All-Star Sergio Romo. Since 1982, 15 Lions have been drafted, most recently in 2018 when the Baltimore Orioles selected Tyler Joyner in the 30th round.

Conference membership history (Division I only) 
2019–present: ASUN Conference

Mike D. Lane Field 

Mike D. Lane Field is a baseball stadium on the North Alabama campus in Florence, Alabama that seats 750 people. It was opened in 1984. It was dedicated to former head coach Mike D. Lane on March 11, 2008, to a crowd of 1,874.

Head coaches 
Records taken from the 2020 UNA Baseball Record Book

Lions in the Major Leagues

Taken from the 2020 UNA Baseball Record Book. Updated February 25, 2020.

See also
List of NCAA Division I baseball programs

References

 
1932 establishments in Alabama
Baseball teams established in 1932